The Chao Phraya Express Boat ( Ruea Duan Chao Phraya) is a transportation service in Thailand operating on the Chao Phraya River. It provides riverine express transportation between stops in the capital city of Bangkok and to Nonthaburi, the province immediately to the north. Established in 1971, the Chao Phraya Express Boat Company serves both local commuters and tourists. It also offers special tourist boats and a weekend river boat tours, as well as offering boats available for charter. Along with BTS Skytrain and Bangkok MRT, using the boats allows commuters to avoid traffic jams during the peak hours on weekdays.

The  route is served by 65 boats and operates from 06:00–21:30 (last departure from CEN-Sathorn pier of a yellow flagged boat) on weekdays and from 06:00–18:40 on weekends and holidays. Current prices are from THB10 (Local line for distance within one zone) to THB32 (for green-yellow flag trip on its entire route from Pakkret to Sathon), depending on the type of boat and the distance travelled. The river boats carry an average of about 40,000 passengers per day.

Boats

Chao Phraya Express boats operates mainly two types of boats; all of them are built mainly out of wood.

The area on the back of the boat (floor painted yellow) is normally restricted to embarking and disembarking passengers, but some people like to stand there when the boat is highly crowded. There are two 2-step stairs on each side of the boat connecting the yellow pad on the back to the passenger area inside the boat, while in between those stairs is a non-functioning on-board toilet. The engine room, in the appearance of a large wooden box, is inboard in the center line of the boat in front of the seating area. There are two rows of seats on the left and another two on the right and an aisle passing in the middle. On the newer boats, the roof from over the engine room to the middle section of the boat is raised for extra headroom because most standing passengers on crowded boats are standing there. This design has been applied to all other boats that are being built in the company's shipyards in Bangkok and Ayutthaya. These type of boats operate on all non-flagged, orange-flagged and green-yellow-flagged boats, but also off-peak direction trips of yellow-flagged boats. The fleet has about 50 boats of this type.
 Twin-screw boat or "super size" boat: This type of boat holds around 120 to 180 passengers. Unlike the single-screw boat, the boat driver sits in a small pod above the passenger deck, similar to a cockpit on board a Boeing 747 airliner, giving view for passenger in the front-most row and public access to the boat's front deck for passengers who desire to watch the view from the boat's front without any obstruction (except for the Thai national flag). Unlike a single-screw boat, its seating area stretches over the entire boat, while most seating is in front of engines. The engine rooms are placed lower than those in single-screw boats, and some passengers prefer to sit on them when it is crowded. There are 8 seats behind each engine. There are two aisles in the seating area in front of the engines and 3 aisles behind the engines. There are two toilets, one on the port and another one on the starboard, located in front of the engines. This type of boat serves as yellow flagged express boat in peak hours, and serves as tourist boats in off-peak hours. The fleet has about 15 boats of this type.

All seats on board all boats have individual life jackets and there are lifebuoys around the boat that can be used in case of an emergency.

27 electric boats are under construction for the service.

Piers

References

External links

Chao Phraya Express Boat site
Chao Phraya Express at TransitBangkok.com
Map of Chao Phraya Express, Khlong boats, BTS, and MRT  
The Mass Transport Boats of Bangkok (Chao Phraya Express) (Photos)
MarineLink.com review
Chaopraya express boat Guide

Chao Phraya River
Water transport in Bangkok
Ferry companies of Thailand
Transport companies established in 1971
1971 establishments in Thailand
Water taxis